Kardi Kola (also Romanized as Kārdī Kolā; also known as Kārdī Kolā-ye Sharqī) is a village in Khvosh Rud Rural District, Bandpey-ye Gharbi District, Babol County, Mazandaran Province, Iran. At the 2006 census, its population was 656, in 165 families.

References 

Populated places in Babol County